The 1946–47 Football League season – the first Football League season after the end of the Second World War – was Birmingham City Football Club's 44th in the Football League and their 18th in the Second Division, to which they were relegated at the end of the last completed season before the war. They finished in third position in the 22-team division, three points adrift of the promotion places. They entered the 1946–47 FA Cup at the third round proper and lost to Liverpool in the sixth (quarter-final).

Twenty-five players made at least one appearance in nationally organised competition, and there were fourteen different goalscorers. Goalkeeper Gil Merrick missed only one of the 45 matches over the season, and Cyril Trigg was leading scorer with 19 goals, of which 17 came in the league.

Football League Second Division

Note that not all teams completed their playing season on the same day. Birmingham were in second place after their last game of the season, on 26 May, but by the time the last game was played, on 14 June, Burnley had drawn one and won one of their two outstanding fixtures to overtake them by three points.

League table (part)

FA Cup

Appearances and goals

Players with name struck through and marked  left the club during the playing season.

See also
Birmingham City F.C. seasons

References
General
 
 
 Source for match dates and results: 
 Source for lineups, appearances, goalscorers and attendances: Matthews (2010), Complete Record, pp. 328–29.
 Source for kit: "Birmingham City". Historical Football Kits. Retrieved 22 May 2018.

Specific

Birmingham City F.C. seasons
Birmingham